The 1964–65 Intertoto Cup was won by Polonia Bytom, losing finalists the previous season, who defeated Lokomotive Leipzig in the final - believed to be the first held over two legs in the tournament's history. A total of 44 clubs participated, down four on the previous season, and clubs from Bulgaria and Greece took part for the first time. The competition was also affected by the decision of UEFA to prevent clubs who were taking part in the European Cup or UEFA Cup Winners' Cup continuing games in other European competitions after the end of the summer break. These clubs had to be given byes through the knock-out rounds until they were eliminated from the UEFA competitions, or withdrawn entirely.

Group stage
The teams were divided into eleven groups of four clubs each, it proving impossible to secure enough club to fill twelve groups. The groups were divided geographically - 'A' for Belgium, the Netherlands, Switzerland and West Germany; 'B' for Austria, Bulgaria, Czechoslovakia, East Germany, Poland, Yugoslavia and one club from Sweden; while 'C' (which had only 3 groups) was for France, Greece and Sweden, as well as one club each from Czechoslovakia, Poland and West Germany, and two from Yugoslavia, to make up the numbers. The eleven group winners (shown in bold in the tables below) advanced to the knock-out rounds.

Group A1

Group A2

Group A3

Group A4

Group B1

Group B2

Group B3

Group B4

Group C1

Group C2

Group C3

First round
Byes were given to DWS and Malmö FF and because they were participating in the European Cup, and were not allowed to continue in the Intertoto Cup after the summer break.
The remaining clubs were drawn into three ties and three byes - the clubs which received byes were Hertha Berlin, Lokomotive Leipzig and Polonia Bytom. This replaced the system used the previous year, of allowing the best losing teams to qualify.

Quarter-finals
 Malmö FF had by this point been eliminated from the European Cup, and so re-entered the tournament; but DWS were still playing, so they were withdrawn.
 As a result, the remaining clubs were drawn into three ties and one bye - the club which received the bye was Liège.

Semi-finals

Final

See also
 1964–65 European Cup
 1964–65 UEFA Cup Winners' Cup
 1964–65 Inter-Cities Fairs Cup

Notes

External links
 Intertoto Cup 1964–65 by Karel Stokkermans at RSSSF
  by Pawel Mogielnicki

UEFA Intertoto Cup
4